Nissan and its spinoff, Jatco, have produced a large number of automatic transmissions for many auto makers.

Naming

The first Nissan/Jatco transmission, the Jatco 3N71 transmission, used a simple naming scheme: the "3" meant "3-speed", and the remainder was the series number. Beginning in 1982, it gained a locking torque converter (L3N71b) for greater efficiency. (See L3N71 link below). It gained an overdrive section in 1983 (L4N71b), culminating with preliminary electronic sensors and control functions being added in 1985 (E4N71b), and proceeding with the initial "R" for "rear wheel drive" with the RL4R01A/RE4R01A. This same system was used with the RL3F01A front wheel drive transaxle and its descendants through the RE4F04A.

Jatco has switched to a new naming scheme starting with a "J" for Jatco, then "F" or "R" for front- or rear-wheel drive. The next digit is the number of gears, while the model series is now two digits sequentially. The model series names were not directly mapped – for instance the model designation changed when the RE4F04A was renamed to JF403E, while the RE4R03A became the JR403E.

Many OEM users assign their own model numbers.

Conventional automatic transmissions

Longitudinal engine rear wheel drive transmissions
 1969–1989 3N71 (Nissan: L3N71B) — 3-speed
 1983–1990 4N71 (Jatco: JR401/JR401E, Nissan: L4N71B/E4N71B, Mazda: N4A-EL) — 4-speed
 1988–2004 4R01 (Jatco: JR402/JR402E, Nissan: RL4R01A/RE4R01A/RE4R01B, Mazda: R4A-EL) — 4-speed
 ?–? 4R03 (Jatco: JR403E, Nissan: RE4R03A/RG4R01A) — 4-speed
 ?–? JR405E (Mazda: RC4A-EL) — 4-speed
 1989–? 5R01 (Jatco: JR502E/JR503E, Nissan: RE5R01A) — 5-speed
 2002–present 5R05 (Jatco: JR507E/JR509E, Nissan: RE5R05A) — 5-speed
 2009–present 7R01 (Jatco: JR710E/JR711E, Nissan: RE7R01A/RE7R01B) — 7-speed
 2019–present JR913E (JATCO JR913E 9 speed automatic transmission) — 9-speed
Notes
a.Original design by Mercedes-Benz, Jatco variant modified and produced by Jatco under license for Nissan and Infiniti vehicles. (In reference to the JR913E only.)

Transverse engine front wheel drive transaxles
 1982–1990 RL3F01A/RN3F01A — 3-speed transaxle
 1982–1985 RL4F01A — 4-speed transaxle
 1985–1994 RE4F02A/RL4F02A — 4-speed transaxle
 1991–2001 RE4F03A/RL4F03A — 4-speed transaxle
 1992–2001 RE4F04A/RE4F04V — 4-speed transaxle (aka GEO/Isuzu 4F20E/JF403E and Mazda LJ4A-EL)
 3-speed ultra lightweight keicar
 Suzuki Alto, Mazda Carol
 3-speed high-performance keicar
 Mitsubishi eK Wagon, Mitsubishi Minica, Nissan Otti
 3-speed high-performance compact
 Proton Perdana
 4-speed ultra lightweight keicar
 Mitsubishi eK Active, Classy, Sport, Wagon, i, Nissan Otti
 Jatco JF405E — 4-speed ultra-light compact (formerly JF402E)
 Suzuki Wagon-R, Suzuki MR Wagon, Nissan Moco, Mazda AZ-Wagon, Mazda Laputa, Hyundai Atoz, Kia Morning, Daewoo Matiz
 Jatco JF404E — 4-speed ultra-light compact
 VW Polo, VW Lupo, SEAT Arosa, Škoda Fabia
 4-speed compact
 Nissan Tiida, Nissan Note, Nissan March, Nissan Wingroad, Nissan Bluebird Sylphy, Renault Samsung SM3
 4-speed small/medium
 Mitsubishi Grandis, Mitsubishi Galant, Mitsubishi Lancer, Mitsubishi Lancer Wagon
 4-speed medium
 Mitsubishi Lancer Cargo

 4-speed medium/large
 Nissan Altima, Nissan Quest, Nissan X-Trail, Renault Samsung SM5
 Jatco JF506E/F5A5 5-speed medium/large
 VW Golf, VW Sharan, MG Rover, Land Rover Freelander, Jaguar X-Type, Ford Mondeo, Audi A3, Mazda MPV, Mitsubishi Lancer Evolution
 Jatco JF613E 6-speed medium/large
 Renault Laguna, Renault Scénic, Nissan Qashqai, Mitsubishi Outlander

Continuously variable transmissions

Front wheel drive
 Jatco JF011E
 Nissan Lafesta, Nissan Serena, Nissan Sentra, Renault Fluence, Nissan Bluebird Sylphy, Nissan X-Trail (T31), Mitsubishi Outlander (2008-), Mitsubishi Lancer (2008-), Mitsubishi Outlander Sport (2011-), Dodge Caliber, Jeep Compass, Jeep Patriot, Suzuki Kizashi
 Jatco JF009E
 Nissan Tiida (Versa), Nissan Note, Nissan Cube, Nissan March, Nissan Wingroad
 Mitsubishi F1C1A
 Mitsubishi Colt, Mitsubishi Colt Plus, Mitsubishi Lancer (non US market, pre-2008), Hyundai Sonata (Korean domestic, 2001~2002)
 Jatco F06A
 Nissan Primera
 Jatco JF010E
 Nissan Teana, Nissan Presage, Nissan Murano
 Jatco CVT7 (Jatco JF015E / Wide ratio Jatco JF020E) Ratio coverage 7.3 and 8.7 for WR
 Mitsubishi Mirage, Mitsubishi Delica D:2, Nissan Cube, Nissan Juke, Nissan Latio, Nissan March, Nissan Note, Nissan Sylphy, Nissan Lannia, Suzuki Alto Eco, Suzuki Hustler, Suzuki Solio, Suzuki Spacia, Suzuki Splash, Suzuki Swift, Suzuki Wagon R
 Jatco CVT8 (Jatco JF016E / Jatco JF017E / Hybrid Jatco JF018E / Hybrid Jatco JF019E) Ratio coverage 7.0 Max torque 250 -380 Nm
 Infiniti QX60, Nissan NV200, Nissan Serena, Nissan Teana, Nissan X-Trail, Nissan Rogue (USA & Canada), Mitsubishi Outlander, Mitsubishi Eclipse Cross
 Jatco CVT S Ratio coverage 6.0 for mini vehicle below 1L 
 Jatco CVT X (JF022E) Ratio coverage 8.2 Max torque 330 Nm
 Nissan Qashqai 2021, X-trail 2021

Rear wheel drive
 Jatco JR006E: Toroidal CVT Maximum torque 370 Nm
 Nissan Skyline 350GT-8 (2002-2006)

Hybrid vehicle systems
  JR712E Rear wheel drive; 7-speed Hybrid vehicle. 3.5L V6 Engine Infiniti Q50
 CVT 8 for Serena S Hybrid (Mild hybrid) 2013
 CVT 8 Hybrid for Nissan Pathfinder Hybrid 2014 and Infiniti QX60 Hybrid 2014-2018
 CVT 8 Hybrid for Nissan X-Trail 2015

References

See also
 Jatco
 Nissan

Jatco transmissions